Viewpoint may refer to:
 Scenic viewpoint, a high place where people can gather to view scenery

In computing
 Viewpoint model, a computer science technique for making complex systems more comprehensible to human engineers
 Viewpoint Corporation, a digital media company known for its subsidiary Fotomat
 Viewpoint Media Player, a software product made by Viewpoint Corporation, and the associated file format
 ViewPoint, the operating system of the Xerox Daybreak computer

In arts and entertainment
 Viewpoints, an acting technique based on improvisation
 Camera angle, in photography, filmmaking, and other visual arts

Games
 Viewpoint (video game), shooter video game
 Viewpoint (card game), dedicated deck card game

Television
 Viewpoint (Australian TV program), a 2012–2017 Australian current affairs television program broadcast on Sky News Australia
 Viewpoint (British TV series), a 2021 British drama television series
 Viewpoint (Canadian TV program), a 1957–1976 Canadian current affairs television program which aired on CBC
 Viewpoint (Philippine TV program), a 1984–1994 Philippine late night public affairs talk show and television program that was broadcast on GMA network
 Viewpoint (talk show), an American television talk show, mostly hosted by Eliot Spitzer, that aired on Current TV

Other uses
 ViewPoint, a skyscraper in the American city of Atlanta
 Viewpoint School, a K-12 school in Calabasas, California, US
 Viewpoints Research Institute, a nonprofit organization focused on education, systems research, and personal computing

See also 
 Point of view (disambiguation)
 View Point, a land form on Antarctica